Annabelle Whitestone, Baroness Weidenfeld, (born October 1944) is an English former concert manager working with classical music impresarios including Ingpen & Williams, Ibbs and Tillett, Wilfrid Van Wyck, the English Bach Festival and Conciertos Daniel in Madrid 

The Polish-American pianist Arthur Rubinstein credited Whitestone with assisting the careers of two of his protégés, François-René Duchâble and Janina Fialkowska, as well as introducing him to the chamber music of Mozart, Haydn, and Beethoven "with all sorts of combinations of string and wind instruments which I never even heard."

In 1977, the 90-year-old Rubinstein left his wife after 45 years of marriage for Whitestone and lived with her in Geneva, Switzerland, until he died in 1982. Whitestone helped Rubinstein to write the second volume of his autobiography, My Many Years, which he dedicated to her.  Rubinstein's original collaborator, Tony Madigan, whom he met in Marbella, transcribed the first phase of the book.

Whitestone convened Remembering Rubinstein, a day of talks and concerts at the Royal Academy of Music on 22 January 2008, to honour the pianist "who once sold as many records as rock stars and was as much at ease in the White House as he was with his chums Picasso and Charlie Chaplin."
Lady Weidenfeld is a member of the advisory board of the Jerusalem Music Centre and the Jerusalem Foundation, a member of the board of directors of the Arthur Rubinstein International Music Society, and a member of the Honorary Advisory Board of the Jewish Music Institute SOAS. Lady Weidenfeld also is the manager of concert pianist Menahem Pressler.

Annabelle Whitestone was married to British publisher Lord Weidenfeld from 1992 until he died in 2016.

References

Living people
Secretaries
English editors
British music managers
British Jews
1946 births
Weidenfeld
Spouses of life peers